The Ceremonies is a novel by T. E. D. Klein published in 1984.

Plot summary
The novel opens with the arrival of an evil entity countless years before the dawn of humanity and life as it is known on earth. It eventually manages to meet and coerce a human boy to serve it, with the goal of eventually returning to its true strength. 

Decades later, graduate student and adjunct professor Jeremy Freirs decides to rent a renovated chicken coop located in the New Jersey countryside. The property sits on the farm of Sarr Poroth, who along with his wife Deborah, belong to a restrictive and conservative religious sect that prides itself on eschewing modern conveniences and the modern world as a whole. Prior to traveling to the farm Jeremy meets Carol, a library assistant and failed novitiate to whom he is drawn. While they believe their meetings to be random coincidence, in truth they were orchestrated by the elderly Mr. Rosebottom, the human boy from so long ago. 

Rosebottom's goal is to guide Carol through a series of rituals preparing her for a final one to be held on Lammas, using her naiveté to ensure that she is unaware of her participation. This final ritual will use Carol's body to birth the evil entity. Jeremy is to be killed and reanimated by the entity so it can serve as its own "father". While Rosebottom is busy in the city with Carol, a remnant of the entity manages to possess one of the Poroth's cats and eventually Deborah herself, in the process killing its hosts. As the rituals continue the arcane magic results in dramatic environmental changes in New Jersey and New York, as well as disturbances in the Poroth's religious community and the formation of a suspected volcano in an area close to the Poroth farm. This causes the community to believe that Jeremy's presence is the cause. 

On the night of the ceremony Rosebottom arrives with Carol to the Poroth farm. It works with Rosebottom to prepare the volcanic hill for the ritual, however they fail to obtain Jeremy as a host. The entity instead possesses Sarr, discarding Deborah's body in a wasp-filled shed, unintentionally trapping the insects. It also manages to abscond with Carol, after drugging both her and Jeremy and tying them up. As the community arrives to force Jeremy to leave, Rosebottom hides in the shed, unaware that it is full of angry wasps, and is stung to death. The angry religious members arrive and discover Jeremy, unconscious and tied up. When he comes to, Jeremy realizes where the entity has taken Carol and manages to arrive just as the ceremony is in progress but has not been completed. He manages to defeat the entity; however, a remnant of it escapes. 

The book ends with Jeremy and Carol walking through New York City. The pair are now married and while the ceremony was seemingly unsuccessful, Jeremy briefly worries that the entity is still out there.

Release 
The Ceremonies is an extension of Klein's earlier novella, "The Events at Poroth's Farm", which he released in 1972. 

The novel was first published in the United States in 1984 through Viking Adult, which released a hardback edition. A mass-market paperback edition was released the following year in the United States and United Kingdom via Bantam Books and Pan, respectively. The Ceremonies was later translated into Japanese in 2004 (復活の儀式. lit. Resurrection Ritual) and Spanish (Ceremonias macabras, lit. Macabre Ceremonies)  in 1987.

An audiobook adaptation narrated by Adam Sims was released in 2019 via Audible Studios.

Reception
Dave Langford reviewed The Ceremonies for White Dwarf #77, and stated that "Besides the thought that this is overdoing it a bit, one wonders where 'beyond the farthest depths of space' may be, and whether a sunless cavern there is necessarily darker than one near Milton Keynes. Yet Klein's writing has been praised; presumably it's what the market wants. . . ."

In 2020 Sam Reader of Tor Nightfire noted that they were recommended the novel several times while also criticizing the novel's treatment of Carol, noting that it did not hold up to modern-day scrutiny towards relationships and consent.

Reviews
Review by Fritz Leiber (1984) in Locus, #282 July 1984
Review by Steven Mariconda (1984) in Crypt of Cthulhu, #25 Michaelmas 1984
Review by Michael A. Morrison (1984) in Fantasy Review, October 1984
Review by C. J. Henderson (1984) in Whispers #21-22, December 1984
Review by Don D'Ammassa (1986) in Science Fiction Chronicle, #76 January 1986

References

1984 American novels